Per Carlsén (born 24 June 1960, in Sundsvall) is a Swedish curler.

Carlsén started playing curling in 1975. He plays in fourth position as a skip and is right-handed.

In 2001 he was inducted into the Swedish Curling Hall of Fame.

References

External links
 

Living people
1960 births
People from Sundsvall
Swedish male curlers
Swedish curling champions
Sportspeople from Västernorrland County